The 2016 Supertaça de Angola (29th edition) was contested by Recreativo do Libolo, the 2015 Girabola champion and Bravos do Maquis, the 2015 cup winner. Recreativo do Libolo was the winner, making it is's 2nd title in a row.

Match details

See also
 2015 Angola Cup
 2016 Girabola
 2016 Recreativo do Libolo season
 Bravos do Maquis players

References

Supertaça de Angola
Super Cup